Evergreen, also known as Huckabee, is an unincorporated community in Autauga County, Alabama.

References

Unincorporated communities in Autauga County, Alabama
Unincorporated communities in Alabama